The following list is a discography of production and songwriting contributions by MNEK, a British record producer and recording artist from East London, United Kingdom. It is split into the full list of contributions and those that have performed in the charts across various countries.

International singles and certifications

Songs written and produced by MNEK

References

Discographies of British artists
Production discographies
Production discography